Utica Parks and Parkway Historic District is a national historic district located at Utica in Oneida County, New York.  It consists of four contributing historic elements: a historic right-of-way known as the Memorial Parkway and the three large parks it connects: Roscoe Conkling Park, F.T. Proctor Park, and T.R. Proctor Park.  The district includes seven contributing buildings, three contributing sites, 26 contributing structures, and five contributing objects.  The park and parkway system was designed between 1908 and 1914 by the firm of Olmsted Brothers Landscape Associates, headed by Frederick Law Olmsted, Jr. The Utica Zoo is located in Roscoe Conkling Park.

It was listed on the National Register of Historic Places in 2009.

History
In 1905, Thomas R. Proctor announced he was donating land to the city of Utica for public use. “For his generosity, July 9 was declared ‘Proctor Day’ and was celebrated by a parade or special festivities in the parks." The Olmsted family that designed the Emerald Necklace in Boston and Central Park in New York City, also designed the parks for Utica: Frederick T. Proctor, Thomas R. Proctor, and Roscoe Conkling Parks. These city parks are known today to accommodate athletic activities, public events, and fundraisers.

Frederick T. Proctor Park
Frederick T. Proctor Park is located on the corner of Rutger Street and Culver Avenue. It has approximately sixty-two acres of land that offers people of all ages space to walk, run, roller blade, ride their bicycles, and engage in other athletic activities. It is considered the “crown jewel” of the parks because it's the smallest of the Utica Parks and Parkway system. This park is known for its country feel that it brings to the city. Along with the country feel, the park includes a lily pond, a butterfly garden, bathhouses, stone staircases, and historic sculptors. “Many of the stone structures in the park were added during the WPA era and though they are not original to the park’s Olmsted design, they are no less significant." The Works Progress Administration (WPA) opened on June 22, 1935, and was a national program of construction and improvement, which assisted in building some of the parks' structures. There is a creek that flows through T. R. Proctor Park and F. T. Proctor Park called Starch Factory Creek. This creek attracts many children during the spring and summer. F. T. Proctor Park is not only known for its landscape, but also its woods. The park contains a vast array of trees and flowers that were planted by the garden club and Conservancy volunteers. This park holds many festivities from birthdays to Fourth of July celebrations. Uticans are yearly entertained by the fireworks at F. T. Proctor Park on Independence Day. Another event this park holds are wine gatherings that raise awareness of the Utica park system. They are hosted by Central New York Conservatory Inc. and sponsored by Quadsimia LLC.

Thomas R. Proctor Park
Thomas R. Proctor Park is located next to F. T. Proctor Park on the corner of Culver Avenue and Welshbush Road. It has a hundred acres of land with baseball and soccer fields, basketball courts, a playground, and running trail. Judge Buckley Pool is across the street and available for the public from Monday through Sunday at 1:00 p.m. to 5:00 p.m. during the summer time. There are many happenings that occur at this park like the two-day soccer tournament. This tournament is called the Redeemer Cup and it brings together over a thousand people from across the city's different ethnic communities. Pastor Rick Andrew is currently the director of the event. Thomas R. Proctor Park is used by local colleges, schools, and individuals.

Roscoe Conkling Park
Roscoe Conkling Park is located on Oneida Street and the Memorial Parkway totaling up to 625 acres. This was the first park developed by the Proctor brothers in 1909. It was designed to give Utica a pastoral appearance. With its natural view, it is seen as one of the major parts in the city; the park includes the Utica Zoo, Valley View Golf Course, Val Bialas Ski and Sled Chalet, Parkway Recreation Center, John Mott Tennis Courts, South Woods switchback trails, and several monuments. The Utica Zoo features a variety of animals on forty acres of land. They have over 200 animals. Drivers will very often see deer on the Memorial Parkway. Throughout the year they host many social events and fundraisers: Eggstravaganza, Wine in the Wilderness, Brewfest, and Spooktacular. Valley View Golf Course was designed by Robert Trent Jones and is used by golfers of all skill levels with three fields: white field having 6409 yards, blue field having 6786 yards, and red field with 5916 yards. Val Bialas Ski and Sled Chalet was named after the third time local Olympian ice skater Valentine Bialas. It offers a rope tow, chair lift, night skiing, ice rink, and chalet with a snack bar. There are five trials each at a different difficulty level and a separate sliding hill. The Parkway Recreation Center, also known as the Edward A. Hanna Recreation Center, contains two modified basketball courts, a playground, weight training station, exercise equipment, walking track, tennis courts, computer room, conference area, and a Utica Sport Hall of Fame. This recreation center is also provided for the Utica Boys & Girls Club and the Parkway Senior Center. Basketball tournaments are held here and there called “Hoops & Dreams,” which is founded and directed by Patrick Johnson. John Mott Tennis Courts are also a part of the recreation center. The South Woods Switchback Trails are groomed in the winter for cross country skiing. Roscoe Conkling Park also has many memorials and statues, including the Eagle Monument.

Memorial Parkway
The Memorial Parkway is a divided parkway with a wide grassy median for most of its length. East of Mohawk Valley Community College the two sides join, and east of the Utica Armory it becomes Culver Avenue. From west to east, the monuments on the Memorial Parkway are:

References

Utica, New York
Historic districts in Oneida County, New York
Historic districts on the National Register of Historic Places in New York (state)
National Register of Historic Places in Oneida County, New York
Statues of Christopher Columbus